"Ahhh Ha" is a song by American rapper Lil Durk. It was released on February 22, 2022, as the third single from his seventh studio album, 7220. The song features subliminal disses towards rapper YoungBoy Never Broke Again, who took shots at Durk's late Only the Family artist, King Von, on his single, "Bring the Hook", from his eighteenth mixtape, Colors (2022).

Background and composition
The song is a response to "Bring the Hook" by rapper YoungBoy Never Broke Again. It features "a menacing, piano-led beat and threatening lyrics", and finds Lil Durk "boasting his street credentials and calling out his opposition". Durk references the deaths of his brother D-Thang and rapper King Von, whom he pays tribute to. He takes shots at YoungBoy's ex-girlfriend Jania Meshell, referencing that she was briefly linked with King Von.

Music video
The music video was directed by Jerry Productions, and sees Lil Durk with his Only the Family crew. Throughout the video, Durk wears a ring paying tribute to D-Thang. He and his crew present stacks of cash and wander in the "snowed out" streets of Englewood, Chicago.

Remixes
American rapper Rowdy Rebel released a freestyle of the song on March 7, 2022. Rapper 22Gz also made a remix.

Charts

Weekly charts

Year-end charts

Certifications

References

2022 singles
2022 songs
Lil Durk songs
Song recordings produced by Southside (record producer)
Songs written by Lil Durk
Songs written by Southside (record producer)
Songs written by TM88
Diss tracks